Mukshpuri, Mushkpuri, or Mukeshpuri is a  mountain in the Nathia Gali Hills, in the Circle Bakote Region of Abbottabad District of the Khyber Pakhtunkhwa province in northern Pakistan. Much of the mountain is covered with Western Himalayan subalpine conifer forests.

The peak 
The route from Nathia Gali on western side of mountain is a steady and  climb. The mountain also has a route on the Dunga Gali side, with a steeper slope. There is a bird sanctuary on this side created with the help of the European Union.

From the top of Mukeshpuri peak, on the eastern edge of Khyber Pakhtunkhwa, the following areas can be seen: — Circle Bakote, Abbottabad University of Science and Technology, Jhelum River, the Bagh District of Azad Kashmir, in the south the city of Murree and the Murree Tehsil, as well as Islamabad.

Gallery

See also 
 List of mountains in Pakistan
 Galyat region - the local region and its towns
 Muree - adjacent in the Murree District

References

External links 
 

Abbottabad District
Mountains of Khyber Pakhtunkhwa
History of Pakistan
Two-thousanders of Pakistan